Jochem is a Dutch masculine given name. It is a form of Joachim. Notable people with the name include:

Jochem Bobeldijk (1920–2010), Dutch sprint canoeist
Jochem Fluitsma (born 1958), Dutch music producer and musician
Jochem de Gruijter (born 1978), volleyball player from the Netherlands
Jochem Hendricks (born 1959), contemporary artist from Frankfurt, Germany
Jochem Hoekstra (born 1992), Dutch racing cyclist
Jochem Jacobs (born 1977), Dutch guitarist, producer and recording engineer
Jochem Jansen (born 1990), Dutch professional footballer
Jochem Pietersen Kuyter (died 1654), early colonist to New Netherland in what would become Harlem on the island of Manhattan
Jochem George Paap (born 1969), Dutch electronic music producer (stage name Speedy J) based in Rotterdam
Jochem Schindler (1944–1994), Austrian Indo-Europeanist
Jochem Swartenhont (1566–1627), Dutch naval officer in the navy of the Dutch Republic
Jochem Tanghe (born 1987), Belgian football goalkeeper
Jochem Uytdehaage (born 1976), former Dutch long track speed skater and two-time Olympic champion
Jochem Verberne (born 1978), former rower from the Netherlands
Jochem Ziegert (born 1954), former German footballer

See also

Joachim (disambiguation)
Joakim
Joaquim
Joaquín

Dutch masculine given names

de:Jochem
fr:Jochem